Prenteg is a hamlet that lies  from Porthmadog, Wales, between Tremadog and Beddgelert.

See also
The July 2010 wind storms in Global storm activity of 2010.

Villages in Gwynedd
Villages in Snowdonia
Dolbenmaen